Still Waters Run Deep is a 1916 British silent crime film directed by Fred Paul and starring Lady Helen Tree, Milton Rosmer and Rutland Barrington. It was based on the 1855 play Still Waters Run Deep by Tom Taylor.

Premise
A captain begins blackmailing a wealthy family. He is found dead, and the wealthy family is caught up in the ensuing investigation of his death. Each member is pitted against each other to prove innocence.

Cast
 Lady Tree - Mrs. Sternhold 
 Milton Rosmer - John Mildmay 
 Rutland Barrington - Mr. Potter 
 Sydney Lewis Ransome - Captain Hawksley 
 Hilda Bruce-Potter - Mrs. Mildmay

References

External links
 

1916 films
British silent feature films
British crime films
Films directed by Fred Paul
Ideal Film Company films
British black-and-white films
1916 crime films
1910s English-language films
1910s British films